Global Centre for Nuclear Energy Partnership is World's first nuclear energy partnership centre at Jasaur Kheri village of Bahadurgarh teshil in Jhajjar district of Haryana state in India. This center facilitates deliberation and discussions of international experts on various issues including innovation in nuclear reactors and the nuclear fuel cycle, development of proliferation-resistant reactors, security technologies and the effects of radiation exposure.

Campus
One among 6 research institutes of Department of Atomic Energy of Govt of India, this campus is located on 400 acre land in NCR Delhi.

Schools
5 schools are:
 School of Advanced Nuclear Energy System Studies (SANESS
  School of Nuclear Security Studies (SNSS)
 School on Radiological Safety Studies (SRSS)
 School of Nuclear Material Characterization Studies (SNMCS)
 School for Studies on Applications of Radioisotopes and Radiation Technologies (SARRT)

Courses
The institute offers training courses and workshops in various areas through its schools.

See also
 International Solar Alliance

External links
 official website

References

Nuclear technology in India
Atoms for Peace